Three Kingdoms is a 2010 Chinese television series based on the events in the late Eastern Han dynasty and the Three Kingdoms period. The plot is adapted from the 14th century historical novel Romance of the Three Kingdoms and other stories about the Three Kingdoms period. Directed by Gao Xixi, the series had a budget of over 160 million RMB (US$30 million) and took five years of pre-production work. Shooting of the series commenced in October 2008, and it was released in China in May 2010.

Three Kingdoms set a record as the most expensive small screen series in China's television history at the time, having been sold to four regional TV broadcasters at the price of 160 million yuan. The series was a commercial success in China and dominated ratings, but has caused controversy among critics and fans, with many commenting that the TV series has veered too far from the classic novel and real history. The series was criticised for prioritizing commercial entertainment over research and understanding of the novel and history and creating plot-holes in its re-interpretation. While some publications have praised the willingness to rewrite the events of the novel, other publications criticize the writing and editing for being sluggish, long-winded and superfluous, and using clichés from "Gongdou"-dramas and romantic dramas to be eye-catching while losing the solemnity and dignity of the original novel. It has also been sold to over 20 countries, earning an estimated 800 million RMB (US$133.3 million) in total as of May 2012.

List of episodes

Cast

Main
 Chen Jianbin as Cao Cao
 Yu Hewei as Liu Bei
 Lu Yi as Zhuge Liang
 Yu Rongguang as Guan Yu
 Kang Kai as Zhang Fei
 Nie Yuan as Zhao Yun
 Ni Dahong as Sima Yi
 Yu Bin as Cao Pi
 Luo Jin as Liu Xie
 Xiaodingge as Liu Xie (child)
 Lü Xiaohe as Dong Zhuo
 Peter Ho as Lü Bu
 Chen Hao as Diao Chan
 Zhang Bo as Sun Quan
 Zheng Wei as Sun Quan (child)
 Ruby Lin as Lady Sun
 Victor Huang as Zhou Yu
 Sha Yi as Sun Ce
 Liu Jing as Da Qiao
 Zhao Ke as Xiao Qiao

Supporting
 Li Li as Bao Long
 Bai Yu as Lady Bian
 Cao Xiwen as Lady Cai (Liu Biao's wife)
 Li Fangyao as Cai He
 Liu Dan as Cai Mao
 Hu Zi as Cai Yang
 Guo Miaoxin as Cai Zhong
 Liu Zijiao as Empress Cao
 Zhao Lei as Cao Bao
 An Pengzeyu as Cao Chong
 Li Daiqing as Cao Hong
 Yuan Shaoxiong as Cao Fang
 Yang Guang as Cao Ren
 Yang Demin as Cao Rui
 Xia Tian as Cao Shuang
 Guo Jiyun as Cao Song
 Li Gen as Cao Zhang
 Zhao Jin as Cao Zhen
 Li Jichun as Cao Zhi
 Wang Jinjun as Cheng Dekou
 Shang Yue as Chen Deng
 Sun Hongtao as Chen Gong
 Lu Jidong as Chen Gui
 Sun Hai as Chen Qun
 Ding Xiaonan as Chen Ying
 Zhong Minghe as Cheng Pu
 Jiang Changyi as Cheng Yu
 Cao Zhanjun as Cui Zhouping
 Jiang Yi as Ding Feng
 Bai Hui as Consort Dong
 Gao Baosong as Dong Cheng
 Yang Chuanxi as Dong Zhao
 Zhang Xinhua as Fa Zheng
 Piao Lan as Lady Fan
 Dong Zhiyong as Fan Qiang
 Wang Daosheng as Fu Jun
 Tang Zidi as Lady Gan
 Xia Xiaolong as Gan Ning
 Chen Gang as Gao Xiang
 Wang Baogang as Gongsun Zan
 Fan Jinlun as Guan Ping
 Wei Zhi as Guan Xing
 Wang Di as Empress Guo
 Zhang Ge as Guo Huai
 Wang Jinxin as Guo Jia
 Gong Zhixi as Guo Si
 Han Zhenguo as Guo Tu
 Liu Jun as Han Dang
 Jiao Zhiqiang as Han Fu
 Hu Sha as Han Sui
 Ying Qiang as Han Xuan
 Qin Fanxiang as Hao Zhao
 Cai Jun as Hua Tuo
 Zhang Xiqian as Hua Xin
 Ding Xiaonan as Hua Xiong
 Liu Kui as Huang Gai
 Zhao Xu as Huang Kui
 Sun Wanqing as Huang Quan
 Song Laiyun as Huang Zhong
 Ren Xuehai as Ji Ping
 Chen Fusheng as Ji Ling
 Liao Weili as Jia Hua
 Li Muge as Jiang Gan
 Ye Peng as Jiang Wei
 Li Yixiao as Jingshu
 Bai Hailong as Kong Xiu
 Er Hou as Kong You
 Cao Guoxin as Li Dian
 Ge Youyuan as Li Feng
 Sen Zhixue as Li Jue
 Song Chongdong as Li Ru
 Deng Liming as Li Yan
 Ji Chenggong as Liu Biao
 Qiu Shuang as Liu Cong
 Xu Xiao as Liu Dai
 Wang Shigui as Liu Du
 Fan Guan as Liu Qi
 Wang Peng as Liu Shan
 Yang Tong as Liu Xian
 Li Yuemin as Liu Zhang
 Jia Xiang as Lu Ji
 Huo Qing as Lu Su
 Shao Feng as Lu Xun
 Zhao Bingkui as Lü Boshe
 Jerry Chang Lu Feng as Lü Meng
 Chen Yilin as Ma Chao
 Xia Tian as Ma Dai
 Guan Ziqian as Ma Liang
 Zheng Shiming as Ma Su
 Ning Sheng as Ma Teng
 Shang Yisha as Lady Mi
 Hong Pangzi as Mi Fang
 Wu Qiong as Miao Ze
 Da Lin as Niu Jin
 Han Lei as Pan Zhang
 Tian Xiang as Pang De
 Chen Houxing as Pang Ji
 Du Xudong as Pang Tong
 Fan Shide as Pujing
 Xue Xiaolong as Two Qiaos' father
 Pu Youwei as Qin Lang
 Ding Dong as Qin Qingtong
 Dai Qiwen as Shen Yi
 Wang Shijun as Sima Hui
 Zhao Dacheng as Sima Shi
 Miao Yaning as Sima Yan
 Liu Guoguang as Sima Zhao
 Ji Aojun as Sun Huan
 Fan Yulin as Sun Jian
 Li Yatian as Sun Li
 Yang Rui as Sun Qian
 Zhao Xuan as Tao Gongyi
 Tong Han as Tao Qian
 Xu Tao as Tian Feng
 Liu Bingyu as Wang Lang
 Wang Huan as Wang Ping
 Zheng Tianyong as Wang Yun
 Wang Xinjun as Wei Yan
 Wang Mengchuan as Wen Chou
 Kang Qunzhi as Lady Wu
 Wang Maolei as Wu Zhi
 Hu Chunyong as Xiahou Ba
 Li Mengcheng as Xiahou Dun
 Li Qilong as Xiahou Yuan
 Liu Ganhan as Xiang Jun
 Wang Wentao as Xing Daorong
 Guo Tao as Xu Chu
 Chen Wei as Xu Huang
 Sun Yan as Xu Sheng
 Yao Gang as Xu Shu
 Hai Yan as Xu Shu's mother
 Xu Maomao as Xu You
 Yang Rui as Xue Zong
 Shao Yueheng as Xun An
 Li Jianxin as Xun Yu
 Zhang Qifu as Yan Jun
 Li Xu as Yan Liang
 Li Xu as Yan Yan
 Li Xiaowei as Yang Ling
 Lu Dongfu as Yang Song
 Jin Yi as Yang Xiu
 Chen Shanshan as Yang Yi
 Qi Huai as Yu Fan
 Wu Kegang as Yu Jin
 Han Wenliang as Yuan Shang
 Xu Wenguang as Yuan Shao
 Yan Pei as Yuan Shu
 Liu Long as Yuan Tan
 Lan Tian as Yuan Xi
 Bu Sisi as Yunying
 Cai Jin as Zhang Bao
 Tan Jianchang as Zhang He
 Cheng Xiangyin as Zhang Liao
 Li Daguang as Zhang Lu
 Lu Lu as Zhang Ren
 Liu Yajin as Zhang Song
 Chen Xinhua as Zhang Su
 Chen Bing as Zhang Wen
 Zhao Qiusheng as Zhang Yi
 Shen Jie as Zhang Zhao
 Wang Guogang as Zhao Fan
 Li Hua as Zhong Yao
 Zhang Jiaoyang as Zhou Cang
 Zhao Shuijing as Zhou Shan
 Hou Jie as Zhou Tai
 Zhu Lei as Zhu Ran
 Cao Yi as Zhuge Jin
 Ru Xiaobin as Zhuge Jun
 Chao Fan as Zu Mao

Replaced cast

 Jiang Wen was originally cast as Cao Cao, but decided to abandon the role after two directors quit the project. Jiang Wen would later portray Cao Cao in the movie Lost Bladesman. Soon afterwards, Tang Guoqiang, who played Zhuge Liang in Romance of the Three Kingdoms (1994), asked for the role, but it had already been reassigned to Chen Jianbin.
 Ken Watanabe asked director Gao Xixi for the role of Guan Yu. Gao reportedly was unable to meet Watanabe's request for a salary of 30-40 million yuan, and was forced to turn him away. The role eventually went to Yu Rongguang (who previously appeared as Han De in the 2008 film Three Kingdoms: Resurrection of the Dragon).

Soundtrack

Awards

International broadcast

See also
 Romance of the Three Kingdoms (TV series)
 List of media adaptations of Romance of the Three Kingdoms

References

External links
  Three Kingdoms official page on Sina.com
  Three Kingdoms official page on Sohu.com
 

2010 Chinese television series debuts
2010 Chinese television series endings
Television shows based on Chinese novels
Works based on Romance of the Three Kingdoms
Television series set in the Three Kingdoms
Television series set in the Eastern Han dynasty
Chinese historical television series
Television shows written by Zhu Sujin